Atlas is a prominent lunar impact crater that is located in the northeast part of the Moon, to the southeast of Mare Frigoris. Just to the west is the slightly smaller but still prominent crater Hercules. Northeast of Atlas is the large Endymion.

The inner wall of Atlas is multiply terraced and the edge slumped, forming a sharp-edged lip. This is a floor-fractured crater with a rough and hilly interior that has a lighter albedo than the surroundings. Floor-fractures are usually created as a result of volcanic modifications.

There are two dark patches along the inner edge of the walls; one along the north edge and another besides the southeast edges. A system of slender clefts named the Rimae Atlas crosses the crater floor, and were created by volcanism. Along the north and northeastern inner sides are a handful of dark-halo craters, most likely due to eruptions. Around the midpoint is a cluster of low central hills arranged in a circular formation.

Satellite craters
By convention these features are identified on lunar maps by placing the letter on the side of the crater midpoint that is closest to Atlas.

Exploration
The Atlas crater is the primary landing site of the Hakuto-R Mission 1 by ispace, scheduled to launch on December 7, 2022. If successful, this mission could be the first private landing on the lunar surface, and would be the first Japanese probe to land on the Moon.

References

External links
 
 Pyroclastic deposits in Atlas crater from USGS Astrogeology Science Center (Clementine 750-nm (albedo) data)

Impact craters on the Moon